Mosquito control manages the population of mosquitoes to reduce their damage to human health, economies, and enjoyment. Mosquito control is a vital public-health practice throughout the world and especially in the tropics because mosquitoes spread many diseases, such as malaria and the Zika virus.

Mosquito-control operations are targeted against three different problems:

 Nuisance mosquitoes bother people around homes or in parks and recreational areas;
 Economically important mosquitoes reduce real estate values, adversely affect tourism and related business interests, or negatively impact livestock or poultry production;
 Public health is the focus when mosquitoes are vectors, or transmitters, of infectious disease.

Disease organisms transmitted by mosquitoes include West Nile virus, Saint Louis encephalitis virus, Eastern equine encephalomyelitis virus, Everglades virus, Highlands J virus, La Crosse Encephalitis virus in the United States; dengue fever, yellow fever, Ilheus virus, malaria, Zika virus and filariasis in the American tropics; Rift Valley fever, Wuchereria bancrofti, Japanese encephalitis, chikungunya and filariasis in Africa and Asia; and Murray Valley encephalitis in Australia.

Depending on the situation, source reduction, biocontrol, larviciding (killing of larvae), or adulticiding (killing of adults) may be used to manage mosquito populations. These techniques are accomplished using habitat modification, pesticide, biological-control agents, and trapping. The advantage of non-toxic methods of control is they can be used in Conservation Areas.

Monitoring mosquito populations 
Adult mosquito populations may be monitored by landing rate counts, mechanical traps or by, lidar technology For landing rate counts, an inspector visits a set number of sites every day, counting the number of adult female mosquitoes that land on a part of the body, such as an arm or both legs, within a given time interval. Mechanical traps use a fan to blow adult mosquitoes into a collection bag that is taken back to the laboratory for analysis of catch.  The mechanical traps use visual cues (light, black/white contrasts) or chemical attractants that are normally given off by mosquito hosts (e.g., carbon dioxide, ammonia, lactic acid, octenol) to attract adult female mosquitoes. These cues are often used in combination. Entomology lidar detection has the possibility of showing the difference between male and female mosquitoes.

Monitoring larval mosquito populations involves collecting larvae from standing water with a dipper or a turkey baster.  The habitat, approximate total number of larvae and pupae, and species are noted for each collection. An alternative method works by providing artificial breeding spots (ovitraps) and collecting and counting the developing larvae at fixed intervals.

Monitoring these mosquito populations is crucial to see what species are present, if mosquito numbers are rising or falling, and detecting any diseases they carry.

Source reduction 
Since many mosquitoes breed in standing water, source reduction can be as simple as emptying water from containers around the home. This is something that homeowners can accomplish. Mosquito breeding grounds can be eliminated at home by removing unused plastic pools, old tires, or buckets; by clearing clogged gutters and repairing leaks around faucets; by regularly (at most every 4 days) changing water in bird baths; and by filling or draining puddles, swampy areas, and tree stumps.  Eliminating such mosquito breeding areas can be an extremely effective and permanent way to reduce mosquito populations without resorting to insecticides. However, this may not be possible in parts of the developing world where water cannot be readily replaced due to irregular water supply. Many individuals also believe mosquito control is the government's responsibility, so if these methods are not done regularly by homeowners then the effectiveness is reduced.

Open water marsh management (OWMM) involves the use of shallow ditches, to create a network of water flow within marshes and to connect the marsh to a pond or canal. The network of ditches drains the mosquito habitat and lets in fish which will feed on mosquito larvae. This reduces the need for other control methods such as pesticides. Simply giving the predators access to the mosquito larvae can result in long-term mosquito control. Open-water marsh management is used on both the eastern and western coasts of the United States.

Rotational impoundment management (RIM) involves the use of large pumps and culverts with gates to control the water level within an impounded marsh.  RIM allows mosquito control to occur while still permitting the marsh to function in a state as close to its natural condition as possible.  Water is pumped into the marsh in the late spring and summer to prevent the female mosquito from laying her eggs on the soil.  The marsh is allowed to drain in the fall, winter, and early spring.  Gates in the culverts are used to permit fish, crustaceans, and other marsh organisms to enter and exit the marsh.  RIM allows the mosquito-control goals to be met while at the same time reducing the need for pesticide use within the marsh.  Rotational impoundment management is used to a great extent on the east coast of Florida.

Recent studies also explore the idea of using unmanned aerial vehicles as a valid strategy to identify and prioritize water bodies where disease vectors such as Ny. darlingi are most likely to breed.

Nuclear sterile insect technique 
For the first time, a combination of the nuclear sterile insect technique (SIT) with the incompatible insect technique (IIT) was used in Mosquito Control in Guangzhou, China. The results of the recent pilot trial in Guangzhou, China, carried out with the support of the IAEA in cooperation with the Food and Agriculture Organization of the United Nations (FAO), were published in Nature on 17 July 2019. The results of this pilot trial, using SIT in combination with the IIT, demonstrate the successful near-elimination of field populations of the world's most invasive mosquito species, Aedes albopictus (Asian tiger mosquito). The two-year trial (2016–2017) covered a 32.5-hectare area on two relatively isolated islands in the Pearl River in Guangzhou. It involved the release of about 200 million irradiated mass-reared adult male mosquitoes exposed to Wolbachia bacteria.

Biocontrol 

Biological pest control, or "biocontrol", is the use of the natural enemies of pests like mosquitoes to manage the pest's populations. There are several types of biocontrol, including the direct introduction of parasites, pathogens, and predators to target mosquitoes. Effective biocontrol agents include predatory fish that feed on mosquito larvae such as mosquitofish (Gambusia affinis) and some cyprinids (carps and minnows) and killifish. Tilapia also consume mosquito larvae. Direct introduction of tilapia and mosquitofish into ecosystems around the world have had disastrous consequences. However, utilizing a controlled system via aquaponics provides the mosquito control without the adverse effects to the ecosystem.

Other predators include dragonfly (fly) naiads, which consume mosquito larvae in the breeding waters, adult dragonflies, which eat adult mosquitoes, and some species of lizard and gecko. Biocontrol agents that have had lesser degrees of success include the predator mosquito Toxorhynchites and predator crustaceans—Mesocyclops copepods, nematodes and fungi. Predators such as birds, bats, lizards, and frogs have been used, but their effectiveness is only anecdotal.

Like all animals, mosquitoes are subject to disease. Invertebrate pathologists study these diseases in the hope that some of them can be utilized for mosquito management.  Microbial pathogens of mosquitoes include viruses, bacteria, fungi, protozoa, nematodes and microsporidia.

Dead spores of the soil bacterium Bacillus thuringiensis, especially Bt israelensis (BTI) interfere with larval digestive systems.  It can be dispersed by hand or dropped by helicopter in large areas. BTI loses effectiveness after the larvae turn into pupae, because they stop eating.

Two species of fungi can kill adult mosquitoes: Metarhizium anisopliae and Beauveria bassiana.

Integrated pest management (IPM) is the use of the most environmentally appropriate method or combination of methods to control pest populations. Typical mosquito-control programs using IPM first conduct surveys, in order to determine the species composition, relative abundance and seasonal distribution of adult and larval mosquitoes, and only then is a control strategy defined.

Experimental biocontrol methods 

Introducing large numbers of sterile males is another approach to reducing mosquito numbers. This is called Sterile Insect Technique (SIT). Radiation is used to disrupt DNA in the mosquitoes and randomly create mutations. Males with mutations that disrupt their fertility are selected and released in mass into the wild population. These sterile males mate with wild type females and no offspring is produced, reducing the population size.

Another control approach under investigation for Aedes aegypti uses a strain that is genetically modified to require the antibiotic tetracycline to develop beyond the larval stage. Modified males develop normally in a nursery while they are supplied with this chemical and can be released into the wild. However, their subsequent offspring will lack tetracycline in the wild and never mature. Field trials were conducted in the Cayman Islands, Malaysia and Brazil to control the mosquitoes that cause dengue fever. In April 2014, Brazil's National Technical Commission for Biosecurity approved the commercial release of the modified mosquito. The FDA is the lead agency for regulating genetically-engineered mosquitoes in the United States.
In 2014 and 2018 research was reported into other genetic methods including cytoplasmic incompatibility, chromosomal translocations, sex distortion and gene replacement. Although several years away from the field trial stage, if successful these other methods have the potential to be cheaper and to eradicate the Aedes aegypti mosquito more efficiently.

A pioneering experimental demonstration of the gene drive method eradicated small populations of Anopheles gambiae.

In 2020, Oxitec's OX5034 mosquito was approved for release by state and federal authorities for use in Florida in 2021 and 2022. The mosquito also won federal approval to be released into Texas, beginning in 2021.

Trap larva 
This is a process of achieving sustainable mosquito control in an eco friendly manner by providing artificial breeding grounds with an ovitrap or an ovillanta utilizing common household utensils and destroying larvae by non-hazardous natural means such as throwing them in dry places or feeding them to larvae eating fishes like Gambusia affinis, or suffocating them by spreading a thin plastic sheet over the entire water surface to block atmospheric air. Shifting the water with larvae to another vessel and pouring a few drops of kerosene oil or insecticide/larvicide in it is another option for killing wrigglers, but not preferred due to its environmental impact. Most of the ornamental fishes eat mosquito larvae.

Trap adult 
In several experiments, researchers utilized mosquito traps. This process allowed both the opportunity to determine which mosquitoes were affected, and provided a group to be re-released with genetic modifications resulting in the OX513A variant to reduce reproduction. Adult mosquitoes are attracted inside the trap where they die of dehydration.

Fungus
Instead of chemical insecticides, some researchers are studying biocides. Most notably, scientists in Burkina Faso were studying the Metarhizium fungal species. This fungus in a high concentration can slowly kill mosquitoes. To increase the lethality of the fungus, a gene from a spider was inserted into the fungus causing it to produce a neurotoxin. But it is only activated when in mosquito hemolymph. Research was done to show the fungi would not affect other insects or humans.

Oil drip 
An oil drip can or oil drip barrel was a common and nontoxic antimosquito measure. The thin layer of oil on top of the water prevents mosquito breeding in two ways: mosquito larvae in the water cannot penetrate the oil film with their breathing tube, and so drown and die; also adult mosquitoes do not lay eggs on the oiled water.

Larviciding 
Control of larvae can be accomplished through use of contact poisons, growth regulators, surface films, stomach poisons (including bacterial agents), and biological agents such as fungi, nematodes, copepods, and fish. A chemical commonly used in the United States is methoprene, considered slightly toxic to larger animals, which mimics and interferes with natural growth hormones in mosquito larvae, preventing development. Methoprene is frequently distributed in time-release briquette form in breeding areas.

It is believed by some researchers that the larvae of Anopheles gambiae (important vectors of malaria) can survive for several days on moist mud, and that treatments should therefore include mud and soil several meters from puddles.

Adulticiding 

Control of adult mosquitoes is the most familiar aspect of mosquito control to most of the public. It is accomplished by ground-based applications or via aerial application of residual chemical insecticides such as Duet. Generally modern mosquito-control programs in developed countries use low-volume applications of insecticides, although some programs may still use thermal fogging. Beside fogging there are some other insect repellents for indoors and outdoors. An example of a synthetic insect repellent is DEET. A naturally occurring repellent is citronella. Indoor Residual Spraying (IRS) is another method of adulticide. Walls of properties are sprayed with an insecticide, the mosquitoes die when they land on the surface covered in insecticide.

To control adult mosquitoes in India, van mounted fogging machines and hand fogging machines are used.

Use of DDT 

DDT was formerly used throughout the world for large area mosquito control, but it is now banned in most developed countries.

Controversially, DDT remains in common use in many developing countries (14 countries were reported to be using it in 2009), which claim that the public-health cost of switching to other control methods would exceed the harm caused by using DDT. It is sometimes approved for use only in specific, limited circumstances where it is most effective, such as application to walls.

The role of DDT in combating mosquitoes has been the subject of considerable controversy. Although DDT has been proven to affect biodiversity and cause eggshell thinning in birds such as the bald eagle, some say that DDT is the most effective weapon in combating mosquitoes, and hence malaria. While some of this disagreement is based on differences in the extent to which disease control is valued as opposed to the value of biodiversity, there is also genuine disagreement amongst experts about the costs and benefits of using DDT.

Notwithstanding, DDT-resistant mosquitoes have started to increase in numbers, especially in tropics due to mutations, reducing the effectiveness of this chemical; these mutations can rapidly spread over vast areas if pesticides are applied indiscriminately (Chevillon et al. 1999). In areas where DDT resistance is encountered, malathion, propoxur or lindane is used.

Mosquito traps 

A traditional approach to controlling mosquito populations is the use of ovitraps or lethal ovitraps, which provide artificial breeding spots for mosquitoes to lay their eggs. While ovitraps only trap eggs, lethal ovitraps usually contain a chemical inside the trap that is used to kill the adult mosquito and/or the larvae in the trap. Studies have shown that with enough of these lethal ovitraps, Aedes mosquito populations can be controlled. A recent approach is the automatic lethal ovitrap, which works like a traditional ovitrap but automates all steps needed to provide the breeding spots and to destroy the developing larvae.

In 2016 researchers from Laurentian University released a design for a low cost trap called an Ovillanta which consists of attractant-laced water in a section of discarded rubber tire.  At regular intervals the water is run through a filter to remove any deposited eggs and larva. The water, which then contains an 'oviposition' pheromone deposited during egg-laying, is reused to attract more mosquitoes.  Two studies have shown that this type of trap can attract about seven times as many mosquito eggs as a conventional ovitrap.

Some newer mosquito traps or known mosquito attractants emit a plume of carbon dioxide together with other mosquito attractants such as sugary scents, lactic acid, octenol, warmth, water vapor and sounds. By mimicking a mammal's scent and outputs, the trap draws female mosquitoes toward it, where they are typically sucked into a net or holder by an electric fan where they are collected. According to the American Mosquito Control Association, the trap will kill some mosquitoes, but their effectiveness in any particular case will depend on a number of factors such as the size and species of the mosquito population and the type and location of the breeding habitat.  They are useful in specimen collection studies to determine the types of mosquitoes prevalent in an area but are typically far too inefficient to be useful in reducing mosquito populations.

Factor EOF1 
Research is being conducted that indicates that dismantling a protein associated with eggshell organization, factor EOF1 (factor 1), which may be unique to mosquitoes, may be a means to hamper their reproduction effectively in the wild without creating a resistant population or affecting other animals.

Proposals to eradicate mosquitoes 
Some biologists have proposed the deliberate extinction of certain mosquito species. Biologist Olivia Judson has advocated "specicide" of thirty mosquito species by introducing a genetic element which can insert itself into another crucial gene, to create recessive "knockout genes". She says that the Anopheles mosquitoes (which spread malaria) and Aedes mosquitoes (which spread dengue fever, yellow fever, elephantiasis, zika, and other diseases) represent only 30 out of some 3,500 mosquito species; eradicating these would save at least one million human lives per year, at a cost of reducing the genetic diversity of the family Culicidae by 1%. She further argues that since species become extinct "all the time" the disappearance of a few more will not destroy the ecosystem: "We're not left with a wasteland every time a species vanishes. Removing one species sometimes causes shifts in the populations of other species — but different need not mean worse." In addition, anti-malarial and mosquito control programs offer little realistic hope to the 300 million people in developing nations who will be infected with acute illnesses each year. Although trials are ongoing, she writes that if they fail: "We should consider the ultimate swatting."

Biologist E. O. Wilson has advocated the extinction of several species of mosquito, including malaria vector Anopheles gambiae. Wilson stated, "I'm talking about a very small number of species that have co-evolved with us and are preying on humans, so it would certainly be acceptable to remove them. I believe it's just common sense."

Insect ecologist Steven Juliano has argued that "it's difficult to see what the downside would be to removal, except for collateral damage". Entomologist Joe Conlon stated that "If we eradicated them tomorrow, the ecosystems where they are active will hiccup and then get on with life. Something better or worse would take over."

However, David Quammen has pointed out that mosquitoes protect forests from human exploitation and may act as competitors for other insects. In terms of malaria control, if populations of mosquitoes were temporarily reduced to zero in a region, then this would exterminate malaria, and the mosquito population could then be allowed to rebound.

See also 

 Bug zapper
 Chikungunya
 Fly-killing device
 Flying syringe
 Mosquito eater
 Mosquito laser
 Mosquito repellant
 Proposed planned extinction of mosquito species
 Vector control
 West Nile virus

Citations

General references

External links 
 CDC info page on malaria vector control
 The American Mosquito Control Association
 The European Mosquito Control Association
 WHO Vector control site
 Reducing mosquito population the environmental way

Culicidae
Epidemiology
Flies and humans
Insect control
Malaria